Alan Jaggs (1918–2008) was a British film editor.

Selected filmography
 The Return of the Frog (1938)
 Meet Maxwell Archer (1940)
 Dangerous Moonlight (1941)
 Alibi (1942)
 We'll Meet Again (1943)
 Happidrome (1943)
 Rhythm Serenade (1943)
 English Without Tears (1944)
 Mr. Emmanuel (1944)
 Men of Two Worlds (1946)
 The October Man (1947)
 Hungry Hill (1947)
 Escape (1948)
 Cardboard Cavalier (1949)
 Treasure Island (1950)
 Conquest of the Planet of the Apes (1972)
 Battle for the Planet of the Apes (1973)

References

Bibliography 
 Eric Greene. Planet of the Apes as American Myth: Race, Politics, and Popular Culture. Wesleyan University Press, 1998.

External links 
 

1918 births
2008 deaths
People from Exmouth
British cinematographers
British expatriates in the United States